Penalty or The Penalty may refer to:

Sports
 Penalty (golf)
 Penalty (gridiron football)
 Penalty (ice hockey)
 Penalty (rugby)
 Penalty (rugby union)
 Penalty kick (association football)
 Penalty shoot-out (association football)
 Penalty (sports manufacturer)

Entertainment
 The Penalty (1920 film), an American crime film starring Lon Chaney
 The Penalty (1941 film), an American crime film
 Penalty (2019 film), an Indian sports film
 The Penalty (novel), a 2006 sports novel for children by Mal Peet

Other uses
 Penalty (Mormonism), an oath made during the original Nauvoo Endowment ceremony of the Latter Day Saint movement
 Penalty (contract), a type of contractual clause
 Penalty Records, a record label
 Sentence (law)